Metachroma pallidum is a species of leaf beetle. It is found in the United States.

References

Further reading
 Arnett, R.H. Jr., M. C. Thomas, P. E. Skelley and J. H. Frank. (eds.). (2002). American Beetles, Volume II: Polyphaga: Scarabaeoidea through Curculionoidea. CRC Press LLC, Boca Raton, FL.
 Arnett, Ross H. (2000). American Insects: A Handbook of the Insects of America North of Mexico. CRC Press.
 Richard E. White. (1983). Peterson Field Guides: Beetles. Houghton Mifflin Company.
 Riley, Edward G., Shawn M. Clark, and Terry N. Seeno (2003). "Catalog of the leaf beetles of America north of Mexico (Coleoptera: Megalopodidae, Orsodacnidae and Chrysomelidae, excluding Bruchinae)". Coleopterists Society Special Publication no. 1, 290.

Eumolpinae
Beetles described in 1824
Taxa named by Thomas Say
Beetles of the United States